Bert Middlemiss (19 December 1888 – 28 June 1941) was a professional footballer who played for Stalybridge Rovers, Tottenham Hotspur and Queens Park Rangers.

Football career 
The outside left began his career at Stalybridge Rovers before joining Tottenham. Between 1908 and 1919 Middlemiss played a total of 261 matches and found the net on 55 occasions in all competitions for the club. He went on to play for Queens Park Rangers in 1920 and featured in 16 games and scoring once.

Personal
He was youngest of 4 brothers to Thomas Middlemiss and Hannah Collins [later Forsyth]. He married May Elizabeth Lockwood in 1915 and died in Devon in 1941. Herbert and May had two children Herbert F and Beryl M D.

References

External links
 Cartoon of Middlemiss Retrieved 31 January 2009

1888 births
1941 deaths
Footballers from Newcastle upon Tyne
English footballers
Stalybridge Rovers F.C. players
Tottenham Hotspur F.C. players
Queens Park Rangers F.C. players
English Football League players
Association football wingers
English Football League representative players